Propionispora is a genus of Bacillota bacteria classified within the class Negativicutes.

See also
 List of bacterial orders
 List of bacteria genera

References

Veillonellaceae
Gram-negative bacteria
Bacteria genera